Serge Groussard (18 January 1921 – 2 January 2016) was a French journalist and writer, the son of colonel Georges Groussard and Véra Bernstein-Woolbrunn.

Biography
Serge Groussard studied at the Calvin Institute in Montauban, at the La Rochelle high school, and at the Lycée Gouraud in Rabat, Morocco. He later attended the Faculty of Arts and the Sciences Po, both in Paris.

In September 1939, he volunteered for the duration of the Second World War and participated as a pupil infantry officer in the fighting on the Loire. An information officer for the French Resistance, he was arrested in January 1943 by the Gestapo, sentenced to thirty years in prison, and deported to Germany. He recounted this experience in his first published work, Crépuscule des vivants, in 1946.

In 1953, Groussard was a military parachutist. From October 1956 to October 1957 and again in 1959, he served as lieutenant, then captain, in Algeria, to which he dedicated the narrative Écrivain.

His career was devoted to writing novels and stories, for Le Figaro from 1954 to 1962 and l'Aurore from 1962 to 1969.

Selected works
Groussard wrote twenty-five books, including twenty novels, eight of which were adapted to film:

 Crépuscule des vivants (1946)
 Pogrom (1948)
 Solitude espagnole, Prix International du Grand-Reportage, Prix Claude Blanchard (1948)
 Des gens sans importance, Prix Populiste (1949) – adapted to film under the title People of No Importance by Henri Verneuil (1956)
 La Femme sans passé, Prix Femina (1950) – adapted to film under the title The Passerby by Henri Calef (1951)
 Talya (1951)
 Orage à Miami and L'Ancêtre (1954)
 Un officier de tradition (1954)
 Une chic fille, recueils de nouvelles, Grand Prix de la Nouvelle (1956)
 Demain est là (1956)
 La Belle espérance (1958)
 Quartier chinois (1958)
 La Passion du Maure (1960)
 Jeunesse sauvage (1960)
 Mektoub, Prix du roman populiste (1967)
 Tu es soleil (1970)
 Taxi de nuit (1971)
 L'Algérie des adieux (1972)
 La Médaille de sang (1973)
 La Guerre oubliée (1974)
 Les Cobras (1981)

Honours
 Officier de la Légion d'honneur
 Croix de guerre 1939-1945
 Médaille de la Résistance
 Croix de la Valeur militaire
 Chevalier des Arts et des Lettres

External links
 Serge Groussard on Who's Who?
 
 Serge Groussard on INA.fr

20th-century French journalists
French Resistance members
20th-century French writers
1921 births
People from Niort
Officiers of the Légion d'honneur
Recipients of the Croix de Guerre 1939–1945 (France)
Recipients of the Resistance Medal
Sciences Po alumni
École nationale d'administration alumni
Prix Femina winners
Chevaliers of the Ordre des Arts et des Lettres
2016 deaths